Harvard Kennedy School (HKS), officially the John F. Kennedy School of Government, is the school of public policy and government of Harvard University in Cambridge, Massachusetts. The school offers master's degrees in public policy, public administration, and international development, four doctoral degrees, and many executive education programs. It conducts research in subjects relating to politics, government, international affairs, and economics. As of 2021, HKS had an endowment of $1.7 billion. It is a member of the Association of Professional Schools of International Affairs (APSIA), a global consortium of schools that trains leaders in international affairs.

The primary campus of Harvard Kennedy School is on John F. Kennedy Street in Cambridge. The main buildings overlook the Charles River and are southwest of Harvard Yard and Harvard Square, on the site of a former MBTA Red Line trainyard. The School is adjacent to the public riverfront John F. Kennedy Memorial Park.

Harvard Kennedy School alumni include 18 heads of state or government, the most of any graduate institution in the world. Alumni also include cabinet officials, military leaders, heads of central banks, and legislators. In independent rankings, Harvard Kennedy School routinely ranks at the top of the world's graduate schools in public policy, social policy, international affairs, and government.

History

Founding
Harvard Kennedy School was founded as the Harvard Graduate School of Public Administration in 1936 with a $2 million gift (equivalent to roughly $43 million as of 2023) from Lucius Littauer, an 1878 Harvard College alumnus, businessman, former U.S. Congressman, and the first coach of the Harvard Crimson football team.

Harvard Kennedy School's shield was designed to express the national purpose of the school and was modeled after the U.S. shield. The School drew its initial faculty from Harvard's existing government and economics departments, and welcomed its first students in 1937.

The School's original home was in the Littauer Center, north of Harvard Yard, which is now home to Harvard University's Economics Department. The first students at the Graduate School were called Littauer Fellows, participating in a one-year course listing which later developed into the school's mid-career Master in Public Administration program.  In the 1960s, the School began to develop its current public policy degree and course curriculum associated with its Master in Public Policy program.

Renaming and move
In 1966, three years following the assassination of U.S. President and 1940 Harvard College alumnus John F. Kennedy, the school was renamed in his honor.

By 1978, the faculty, including presidential scholar and adviser Richard Neustadt, foreign policy scholar and later dean of the School Graham Allison, Richard Zeckhauser, and Edith Stokey, consolidated the School's programs and research centers at the present Harvard Kennedy School campus. The first new building opened on the southern half of the former Eliot Shops site in October 1978. Under the terms of Littauer's original grant, the current campus also features a building called Littauer.

In 1966, at the same time as the school was renamed, the Harvard Institute of Politics was created with Neustadt as its founding director. Harvard Institute of Politics has been housed on the school campus since 1978, and today sponsors and hosts a series of programs, speeches and study groups for Harvard undergraduates and graduate students. Along with major Harvard Kennedy School events, the Institute of Politics holds its events are held at the John F. Kennedy Jr. Forum, named in honor of the late John F. Kennedy Jr. in Harvard Kennedy School's Littauer Building.

Rebranding and campus expansion 

In late 2007, the Kennedy School of Government announced that while its official name was not being altered, it was rebranding itself as Harvard Kennedy School effective Fall 2008. The goal was to make clearer the school's connection with Harvard. It was also thought that the new branding would reduce confusion with other entities named after Kennedy, such as the Kennedy Center and the Kennedy Library. The rebranding had the support of Senator Edward M. Kennedy, as well as of Caroline Kennedy.

In 2012, Harvard Kennedy School announced a $500 million fundraising campaign, $120 million of which was to be used to significantly expand the Harvard Kennedy School campus, adding 91,000 square feet of space including six new classrooms, a new kitchen, and dining facility, offices and meeting spaces, a new student lounge and study space, more collaboration and active learning spaces, and a redesigned central courtyard. Groundbreaking commenced on May 7, 2015, and the project was completed in late 2017. The new Harvard Kennedy School campus opened in December 2017.

From 2004 to 2015, Harvard Kennedy School's dean was David T. Ellwood, a U.S. Department of Health and Human Services official in the Clinton administration.

In 2015, Douglas Elmendorf, a former director of the U.S. Congressional Budget Office, was named both dean of the Harvard Kennedy School and the school's Don K. Price Professor of Public Policy.

Academics

Degrees 
Harvard Kennedy School offers four master's degree programs. The two-year Master in Public Policy (MPP) program focuses on policy analysis, economics, management, ethics, statistics and negotiations in the public sector. There are three separate Master in Public Administration (MPA) programs: a one-year Mid-Career Program (MC/MPA) intended for professionals who are more than seven years removed from their college graduation; a two-year MPA program intended for professionals who have an additional graduate degree and are more recently out of school; and a two-year international development track (MPA/ID) focused on development studies with a strong emphasis on economics and quantitative analysis.

Members of the mid-career MPA class are Mason Fellows, who are public and private executives from developing countries. Mason Fellows typically constitute about 50 percent of the incoming class of Mid-Career MPA candidates. The Mason cohort is the most diverse at Harvard in terms of nationalities and ethnicities represented. It is named after Edward Sagendorph Mason, the former Harvard professor who, from 1947 to 1958, was dean of Harvard's Graduate School of Public Administration, now known as Harvard Kennedy School.

In addition to the master's programs, Harvard Kennedy School administers four doctoral programs. Ph.D. degrees are awarded in political economy and government in conjunction with Harvard University's departments of economics and government in the Faculty of Arts and Sciences (FAS), in public policy and social policy in conjunction with Harvard's departments of government and sociology, and in health policy in conjunction with FAS and the Harvard School of Public Health.

Joint and concurrent degrees 
Harvard Kennedy School has a number of joint and concurrent degree programs within Harvard and with other leading universities, which allow students to receive multiple degrees in a reduced period of time. Joint and current students spend at least one year in residence in Cambridge taking courses. Harvard Kennedy School joint degree programs are run with Harvard Business School, Harvard Law School, and Harvard Graduate School of Design, and concurrent programs are offered with Harvard Divinity School and Harvard Medical School.

Beyond Harvard, HKS has concurrent degree arrangements with other law, business, and medical schools, including the Stanford Graduate School of Business, the MIT Sloan School of Management, the Tuck School of Business at Dartmouth College, The Wharton School of the University of Pennsylvania, Columbia Law School, Duke University School of Law, Georgetown University Law Center, New York University School of Law, Northwestern University School of Law, Stanford Law School, University of California, Berkeley School of Law, University of Michigan Law School, University of Pennsylvania Law School, Yale Law School, and UCSF Medical Center.

Abroad, Harvard Kennedy School offers a dual degree with the Graduate Institute of International and Development Studies in Geneva.

HKS courses 
Harvard Kennedy School maintains six academic divisions each headed by a faculty chair. In addition to offerings in the Harvard Kennedy School course listing, students are eligible to cross-register for courses at the other graduate and professional schools at Harvard and at the MIT Sloan School of Management, The Fletcher School of Law and Diplomacy at Tufts University, and the MIT School of Architecture and Planning. MPP coursework is focused on one of five areas, called a Policy Area of Concentration (PAC), and includes a year-long research seminar in their second year, which includes a master's thesis called a Policy Analysis Exercise.

Rankings 
Harvard Kennedy School has routinely ranked as the best, or among the best, of the world's public policy graduate schools. U.S. News & World Report ranks it the best graduate school for social policy, the best for health policy, and second best for public policy analysis. In 2015 rankings, Kennedy School is ranked first in the subcategory of health policy and second in the category of public policy analysis and social policy.

Kennedy's School's foreign affairs programs have consistently ranked at the top or near the top of Foreign Policy magazine's Inside the Ivory Tower survey, which lists the world's top twenty academic international relations programs at the undergraduate, Master's, and Ph.D. levels. In 2012, for example, the survey ranked Kennedy School first overall for doctoral and undergraduate programs and third overall in the Master's category.

Student organizations

Harvard Kennedy School maintains a range of student activities, including interest-driven student caucuses, the student government (Kennedy School Student Government, known as KSSG), student-edited policy journals including Harvard Journal of Hispanic Policy, Kennedy School Review, the Journal of Middle Eastern Politics and Policy, a student newspaper (The Citizen), and a number of student athletic groups.

Students can join the Harvard Graduate Council, which is the centralized student government for the twelve graduate and professional schools of Harvard University. The Harvard Graduate Council is responsible for advocating student concerns to central administrators, including the president of Harvard University, provost, deans of students, and deans for the nearly 15,000 graduate and professional students across the twelve schools, organizing large university-wide initiatives and events, administering and providing funding for university-wide student groups, and representing the Harvard graduate student population to other universities and external organizations. Harvard Graduate Council is known for spearheading the "One Harvard" movement, which aims to bring all of Harvard's graduate schools together through closer collaboration and social interaction.

Centers 
Harvard Kennedy School is home to 14 centers, including:
 Ash Center for Democratic Governance and Innovation
 Belfer Center for Science and International Affairs
 Carr Center for Human Rights Policy
 Center for International Development
 Center for Public Leadership
 Edmond & Lily Safra Center for Ethics
 Institute of Politics
 Shorenstein Center on Media, Politics and Public Policy
 Mossavar Rahmani Center for Business and Government
 Rappaport Institute for Greater Boston
 Taubman Center for State and Local Government
 Malcolm Wiener Center for Social Policy
 Joint Center for Housing Studies
 Women and Public Policy Program

The majority of centers offer research and academic fellowships through which fellows can engage in research projects, lead study groups into specific topics and share their experiences with industry and government with the student body.

Controversies 
Under Dean Elmendorf, the school has tried to focus its engagement across the political spectrum, which has caused controversy at times. Recently, the school came under criticism for offering a fellowship to Chelsea Manning on September 13, 2017. It then publicly rescinded the offer on September 15, 2017, after CIA director Mike Pompeo canceled a speaking engagement at Harvard and sent a letter condemning the university for awarding the fellowship.

A 2021 investigative report by student group Fossil Fuel Divest Harvard found that many of the centers' climate initiatives were funded in part by fossil fuel companies, and that some of the centers had allegedly taken several steps to cover up that fact.

The Kennedy School's Carr Center for Human Rights Policy in 2022 invited Kenneth Roth, former executive director of Human Rights Watch, a leading global human rights organizations, to join it as a senior fellow. The Kennedy School eventually rescinded the invitation to Roth because Human Rights Watch had investigated the State of Israel's treatment of Palestinians and concluded in 2021 that it meets the threshold for the "crime of apartheid." After condemnation by faculty, students, The American Civil Liberties Union and others, the dean of the school reversed this decision.

Awards

The Robert F. Kennedy Award for Excellence in Public Service is awarded to "a graduating student whose commitment, activities, and contributions to public service are extraordinary". Several other awards are also awarded on Class Day annually at the end of May.

Notable faculty 

 Graham Allison
 Alan A. Altshuler
 Mary Jo Bane
 David J. Barron
 Jacqueline Bhabha
 Linda Bilmes
 Robert Blendon
 Derek Bok
 George Borjas
 R. Nicholas Burns
 Felipe Calderón
 Albert Carnesale
 Ashton Carter
 Antonia Handler Chayes
 William C. Clark
 Richard Clarke
 Susan P. Crawford
 David Cutler
 Michael Dukakis
 David Ellwood
 Jeffrey Frankel
 Jason Furman
 Marshall Ganz
 David Gergen
 Edward Glaeser
 Robert R. Glauber
 Stephen Goldsmith
 Ricardo Hausmann
 J. Bryan Hehir
 Ronald Heifetz
 A. Leon Higginbotham Jr.
 John P. Holdren
 Swanee Hunt
 Michael Ignatieff
 Sheila Jasanoff
 Christopher Jencks
 Alex Jones
 Dale Jorgenson
 Juliette Kayyem
 Alexander Keyssar
 Robert Z. Lawrence
 Jennifer Lerner
 Viktor Mayer-Schönberger
 Joseph Newhouse
 Pippa Norris
 Joseph Nye
 Rafael O'Ferrall
 Meghan O'Sullivan
 George Papandreou
 Roger B. Porter
 Michael Porter
 Samantha Power
 Lant Pritchett
 Robert Putnam
 Carmen M. Reinhart
 Dani Rodrik
 Todd Rogers (behavioral scientist)
 Kevin Rudd
 John Ruggie
 Juan Manuel Santos
 Frederic M. Scherer
 Jeffrey L. Seglin
 Sarah Sewall
 Kathryn Sikkink
 Lawrence Summers
 Dennis Frank Thompson
 Stephen Walt
 Marilyn Waring
 Martin Weitzman
 Shirley Williams, Baroness Williams of Crosby
 John P. White
 William Julius Wilson
 Richard Zeckhauser
 Dorothy Zinberg
 Jonathan Zittrain
 Robert B. Zoellick

Notable alumni 

Harvard Kennedy School has over 63,000 alumni, many of whom have gone on to notable careers around the world in government, business, public policy, and other fields. Its alumni include 18 heads of state and dozens of leaders of government department and agencies, non-profit public policy organizations, the military, thought leadership and advocacy, academia, and other fields:

Government and politics

Heads of government and state

 Pierre Trudeau (MA '45), former Prime Minister of Canada
 Miguel de la Madrid (MPA '65), former President of Mexico
 Ellen Johnson Sirleaf (MPA '71), former President of Liberia and Nobel Peace Prize laureate
 Carlos Salinas de Gortari (MPA '73, PhD '76), former President of Mexico
 Lee Hsien Loong (MPA '80), current prime minister of Singapore
 Juan Manuel Santos (MPA '81), former President of Colombia and Nobel Peace Prize laureate
 Donald Tsang (MPA '82), former Chief Executive of Hong Kong
 Eduardo Rodríguez Veltzé (MPA '88), former President of Bolivia
 Jamil Mahuad Witt (MPA '89), former President of Ecuador
 José María Figueres Olsen (MPA '91), former President of Costa Rica and current World Economic Forum CEO
 John Haglelgam (MPA '93), former President of the Federated States of Micronesia
 Abdiweli Gaas (MPA '99), former prime minister of Somalia
 Felipe Calderón (MPA '00), former President of Mexico
 Tsakhiagiin Elbegdorj (MPA '02), former President and Prime Minister of Mongolia
 Tshering Tobgay (MPA '04), former Prime Minister and current leader of People's Democratic Party in Bhutan
 Morgan Tsvangirai ('02), former Prime Minister of Zimbabwe
 Frederick Sumaye (MPA '07), former Prime Minister of Tanzania
 Maia Sandu (MPA '10), current President and former Prime Minister of Moldova

Government administrators and officials

 Rizwan Ahmed (MPA), Sindh Public Service Commission member and former Maritime Secretary of Pakistan
 Yam Ah Mee (MPA '91), chief executive director, People's Association in Singapore
 Tariq Bajwa (MPA), former Finance Secretary of Pakistan
 Nisrin Barwari (MPA '99), former Minister of Municipalities and Public Works of Iraq
 Gankhuurai Battungalag, Director General of the Department for Europe of the Ministry of Foreign Affairs of Mongolia
 Charles Blanchard (MPP '85), former General Counsel of the Army and General Counsel of the Air Force
 J. Richard Blankenship (MPA '08), former U.S. ambassador to The Bahamas
 André Boisclair (MPA '05), former leader of Parti Québécois and former Minister of Citizenship and Immigration of Quebec, Canada
 Nick Boles (MPP '89), former Member of Parliament for Grantham and Stamford and former director of Policy Exchange in the United Kingdom
 Emilia Boncodin (MPA '86), former Secretary of Budget and Management for the Philippines
 Anna Escobedo Cabral (MPA '90), former Treasurer of the United States
 Piper Campbell (MPA '99), former U.S. ambassador to Mongolia and Chargé d'affaires ad interim at the U.S. Mission to the Association of Southeast Asian Nations
 Rajkumar Chellaraj (MPA '86), former U.S. Assistant Secretary of State for Administration
 Frank Chikane (MPA '95), member, African National Congress and advisor to President of South Africa
 Aneesh Chopra (MPP '97), former U.S. Chief Technology Officer
 Albert Chua (MPA '00), former Permanent Representative of Singapore to the United Nations
 Henry Cisneros (MPA '73), former U.S. Secretary of Housing and Urban Development
 Mark Daly (MPA, '11), member, Ireland's Seanad Éireann
 Božidar Đelić (MPA '91), former Deputy Prime Minister of Serbia and Minister of Finance of Serbia
 Stephen Donnelly (MPA '08), Ireland Minister of Health and member, Teachta Dála, representing Wicklow
 Shaun Donovan (MPA '95), former U.S. Secretary of Housing and Urban Development and Office of Management and Budget director
 Theodore L. Eliot Jr. (MPA '56), former U.S. ambassador to Afghanistan
 Robert S. Gelbard (MPA '79), former U.S. ambassador to Indonesia and Bolivia
 Héctor Gramajo (MPA '95), former Defense Minister of Guatemala
 Yoshimasa Hayashi (MPA '94), Minister for Foreign Affairs of Japan
 Liu He (MPA '95), Vice Premier of the People's Republic of China
 Teo Chee Hean (MPA '86), Coordinating Minister for National Security for Singapore
 Keith Hennessey (MPP '94), former National Economic Council director
 Rafael Hui (MPA '83), former Chief Secretary for Administration of Hong Kong
 Muhammad Ibrahim (MPA '93), former Central Bank of Malaysia governor
 Natalie Jaresko (MPP '89), former Ukrainian Minister of Finance
 Vuk Jeremić (MPA '03), former President of the United Nations General Assembly and former Minister of Foreign Affairs for Serbia
 Ajay Narayan Jha, former Indian Administrative Service officer, former Expenditure Secretary, and former Finance Secretary of India
 Daniel J. Jones, lead investigator for U.S. Senate Intelligence Committee report on CIA Torture
 Mitzi Johnson (MPA '13), former Speaker of the Vermont House of Representatives
 Lim Hng Kiang (MPA '85), former Minister for Trade and Industry of Singapore
 Ban Ki-moon (MPA '84), former Secretary-General of the United Nations and former Minister of Foreign Affairs of South Korea
 Raymond Kelly (MPA '84), New York City Police Commissioner
 Rajive Kumar (MPA), Indian Administrative Service officer and former Chief Secretary of Government of Uttar Pradesh in India
 Andrew Leigh (PhD '04), Assistant Minister for Competition, Charities and Treasury for Australia and former Australian House of Representatives member
 Nabiel Makarim (MPA '84), former Minister of Environment and Forestry for Indonesia
 Mark McClellan (MPA '91), former U.S. Commissioner of the Food and Drug Administration
 Sanjay Mitra (MPA), IAS officer and former Defence Secretary of India
 Nripendra Misra (MPA), former IAS officer and Principal Secretary to the Prime Minister of India
 Toshimitsu Motegi (MPP '83), Secretary-General of Liberal Democratic Party and former Minister of Foreign Affairs for Japan
 George Muñoz (MPP '78), former Assistant Secretary and CFO of the U.S. Department of Treasury and former president and CEO of OPIC
 Andrew Natsios (MPA '79), former U.S. Agency for International Development administrator and U.S. Special Envoy to Sudan
 Amon Nikoi (MPA '56), former Minister for Finance and Economic Planning, Bank of Ghana governor, and Permanent Representative of Ghana to the United Nations
 Patrick Nip (MPA '01), former Secretary for the Civil Service of Hong Kong
 Christine Nixon (MPA '85), former chief police commissioner for Victoria, Australia
 Herbert S. Okun (MPA '59), former U.S. Ambassador to East Germany and former U.S. Deputy Ambassador to the United Nations
 Nóirín O'Sullivan (Exec '07), former national police commissioner for Ireland
 Marcus Peacock (MPP '86), former Deputy Administrator, U.S. Environmental Protection Agency
 Brune Poirson, Secretary of State of France
 Angelo Reyes (MPA '90), Secretary of Energy of the Philippines and former Secretary of National Defense of the Philippines
 Jesse Robredo (MPA '99), Secretary of Interior and Local Government of the Philippines
 Henry Rotich (MPA '), Cabinet Secretary for National Treasury of Kenya
 Pete Rouse (MPA '77), former White House Chief of Staff
 Nasir Ahmad el-Rufai, Executive Governor of Kaduna State in Nigeria, former Minister of FCT, and Director General of Bureau of Public Enterprises of Nigeria
 T. N. Seshan (MPA '68), former IAS officer and former Chief Election Commissioner and Cabinet Secretary of India
 Tharman Shanmugaratnam (MPA), Senior Minister, Coordinating Minister for Social Policies of Singapore
 Yasuhisa Shiozaki (MPA '82), former Chief Cabinet Secretary of Japan
 Corazon Soliman (MPA '98), former Secretary of the Department of Social Welfare and Development of the Philippines
 T. S. R. Subramanian (MPA), former Indian Administrative Service officer and Cabinet Secretary of India
 Sardar Ahmad Nawaz Sukhera (MPA), Commerce Secretary of Pakistan
 Nancy Sutley (MPP '86), White House Council on Environmental Quality director
 Syahrir (MPA '80, PhD '83), economic adviser, Republic of Indonesia's Council of Presidential Advisors
 Mark E. Talisman (1972), U.S. congressional aide and lobbyist
 William B. Taylor Jr. (MPP '77), U.S. ambassador to Ukraine
 Conrad Tillard (born 1964), Baptist minister, radio host, author, civil rights activist, and politician
 John Tsang (MPA '82), Financial Secretary of Hong Kong
 Paul Volcker (MA '51, GSPA), former chairman of the U.S. Federal Reserve and U.S. presidential economic advisor
 Solomon Areda Waktolla (MPA '13 and LLM'14), deputy chief justice of the Federal Supreme Court of Ethiopia and member of Ethiopia's Permanent Court of Arbitration
 Yin Yong (MPA), mayor of Beijing
 Adolfo Aguilar Zínser (MPA '78), former national security adviser and ambassador to the United Nations for Mexico

Elected federal officials

 Ami Ayalon (MPA '92), former member of Israeli Knesset and Shin Bet director
 Ed Balls (MPA '90), former British Member of the Parliament, Secretary of State for Children, Schools and Families, and Shadow Chancellor of the Exchequer
 Doug Bereuter (MPA '73), former U.S. Congressman for Nebraska's 1st congressional district
 Brendan Boyle (MPP '05), U.S. Congressman for Pennsylvania's 2nd congressional district
 Gerry Connolly (MPA '79), U.S. Congressman, Virginia's 11th congressional district
 Dan Crenshaw (MPA '17), U.S. Congressman, Texas's 2nd congressional district
 David Cunliffe (MPA '95), Labour Party leader in Parliament of New Zealand
 John Fetterman (MPP '99) – U.S. Senator from Pennsylvania and former Lieutenant Governor of Pennsylvania
 Roy Folkman (MPA '13) – member, Israeli Knesset
 Alan Grayson (MPP '83), former U.S. Congressman, Florida's 8th congressional district
 Katherine Harris (MPA '97), former Congresswoman, Florida's 13th congressional district and former Secretary of State of Florida
 Brian Higgins (MPA '96), U.S. Congressman, New York's 26th congressional district
 Steve Horn (MPA '55), former U.S. Congressman, California's 38th congressional district
 Shane Jones (MPA '91), former member, Parliament of New Zealand, and former Minister of Building and Construction of New Zealand
 James Langevin (MPA '94), former U.S. Congressman, Rhode Island's 2nd congressional district
 Stephen Lynch (MPA '99), U.S. Congressman, Massachusetts's 8th congressional district
 Dan Maffei (MPP '95), former U.S. Congressman, New York's 24th congressional district
 Jim Moody (MPA '67), former U.S. Congressman, Wisconsin's 5th congressional district
 Taku Otsuka (MPP '05), a member of the House of Representatives of Japan
 Francis Pangilinan (MPA '98), Senator and the Majority Leader of the Senate of the Philippines
 Yohanan Plesner (MPA '04), member, Israeli Knesset
 Larry Pressler (MPA '66), former U.S. Senator from South Dakota
 William Proxmire (MPA '48), former U.S. Senator from Wisconsin
 Jack Reed (MPP '73), U.S. Senator from Rhode Island
 Joe Sestak (MPA '80, PhD '84), former U.S. Congressman, Pennsylvania's 7th congressional district
 Rob Simmons (MPA '79), former U.S. Congressman, Connecticut's 2nd congressional district
 Ralf Stegner (MPA '89), former leader of the Social Democratic Party in Germany
 Peter G. Torkildsen (MPA '90), former U.S. Congressman, Massachusetts's 6th congressional district and former chair of Massachusetts Republican Party
 Robert Torricelli (MPA '80), former U.S. Senator from New Jersey
 Chris Van Hollen (MPP '85), U.S. Senator from Maryland
 David Wilhelm (MPP '90), campaign manager, Clinton-Gore 1992 campaign and former Democratic National Committee chairman

Elected state and municipal officials

 Bob Anthony (MPA), Oklahoma Corporation Commission member
 Robert Castelli (MPA '96), former member, New York State Assembly
 Jacqueline Y. Collins (MPA '01), member, Illinois Senate, representing the 16th district
 Joseph Curtatone (MPA '11), former mayor, Somerville, Massachusetts
 Fernando Martín García (MPP '74), former New Hampshire State Representative
 Marilinda Garcia (MPA '10), member of the New Hampshire House of Representatives
 Paul Heroux, (MPA '11), Bristol County, Massachusetts sheriff, former Attleboro, Massachusetts mayor, and former Massachusetts State Representative
 Mark Levine (MPP '95), Manhattan borough president and former New York City Councilman
 Elias Mudzuri (MPA ), former Mayor of Harare, Zimbabwe
 Charles A. Murphy, (MPA '02), member of the Massachusetts House of Representatives and Massachusetts House Ways and Means Committee chairman
 Naheed Nenshi (MPP '98), former mayor of Calgary, Alberta
 Barry T. Smitherman (MPA), member of the Texas Railroad Commission
 Kevin White (MA '57, GSPA), former Mayor of Boston
 Anthony A. Williams (MPP '87), former Mayor of Washington, D.C.

Academia 

 William Alonso (MPP '56), economist, former director of Harvard Center for Population Studies
 Lawrence S. Bacow (MPP '76, PhD '76), former Harvard University president, former Tufts University president, former MIT chancellor
 Steve Charnovitz (MPP '83), international law professor, George Washington University Law School
 Ronald A. Heifetz (MPA '83), co-founder, Center for Public Leadership, and public leadership lecturer at Harvard Kennedy School
 Steve Horn (MPA '55), former president of California State University, Long Beach
 Ira Jackson (MPA '86), dean, Peter F. Drucker and Masatoshi Ito Graduate School of Management at Claremont Graduate University
 Nancy Koehn (MPP), author, historian, and Harvard Business School business history professor
 Mark Lilla (MPP '80), professor of humanities, Columbia University
 Hollis Robbins (MPP '90), dean of humanities, University of Utah
 Mark Schuster (MPP '88), dean and founding CEO, Kaiser Permanente Bernard J. Tyson School of Medicine
 Stephen Joel Trachtenberg (MPA '66), former president, George Washington University
 William E. Trueheart (MPA '73), former president, Bryant University
 Jonathan Zittrain (MPA '95), professor of international law, Harvard Law School and co-founder of Harvard's Berkman Klein Center for Internet & Society

Arts

 Will Butler (MPA '17), musician and former member of Arcade Fire
 Ashley Judd (MPA '10), actress and activist
 Hill Harper (MPA '92), actor and author
 Thor Steingraber (MPA '09), opera director
 Damian Woetzel (MPA '07), former principal dancer, New York City Ballet

Business 

 Rune Bjerke (MPA '97), CEO, DNB ASA
 Gregory C. Carr (MPP '86), founder, Boston Technology
 Leonard S. Coleman Jr. (MPA '75), former president of the National League
 Benjamin Fernandes (Exec. Ed'17), Tanzanian entrepreneur
 Debra L. Lee (MPP '80), President and CEO, Black Entertainment Television
 Daniel Mudd (MPA '86), former president and CEO of U.S. Fannie Mae
 Hilda Ochoa-Brillembourg (MPA '71), founder, president, and CEO of Strategic Investment Group
 Greg Rosenbaum (MPP '77), CEO, Empire Kosher Poultry, Inc.
 Peter Sands (MPA '88), Group CEO, Standard Chartered
 Klaus Schwab (MPA '67), founder and executive chairman, World Economic Forum
 Faryar Shirzad (MPP '89), managing director, Goldman Sachs, former U.S. Deputy National Security Advisor
 Chris Voss, adjunct professor at McDonough School of Business

Media

 Komla Dumor (MPA,'03), television news presenter, BBC World News and Africa Business Report
 Mark A. R. Kleiman (MPP, PhD '85), author
 Kevin Corke (MPA '04), White House Correspondent, Fox News
 Justin Fox (born 1964), financial journalist, commentator, and writer
 Caroline Glick (MPP '00), deputy managing editor, The Jerusalem Post
 Kaj Larsen (MPP '07), former U.S. Navy SEAL, journalist for Vice News
 Dambisa Moyo (MPA '07), economist and author
 Bill O'Reilly (MPA '96), political commentator
 Malik Siraj Akbar (MPA, '16), editor-in-chief of The Baloch Hal, exiled Pakistani journalist
 Andrew Sullivan (MPA, PhD '90), journalist, The Atlantic
 Wajahat Saeed Khan, Pakistani journalist for Dunya News & NBC News

Military 

 John C. Acton (Exec '05) – retired United States Coast Guard rear admiral who serves as the Director of Operations Coordination for DHS
 John R. Allen Jr. (Exec '85) – retired United States Air Force brigadier general and highly decorated command pilot
 William J. Begert (Exec '95) – served as commander, Pacific Air Forces, and Air Component Commander for the Commander, United States Pacific Command
 Franklin J. Blaisdell (Exec) – U.S. Air Force Major General
 Sally Brice-O'Hara (MPA '93) – 27th Vice Commandant of the United States Coast Guard
 Dan Crenshaw (MPA '17) – medically retired United States Navy SEAL Lieutenant Commander
 Peter V. Neffenger (MPA '95) – 29th Vice Commandant of the United States Coast Guard and former Administrator of the Transportation Security Administration
 Michael E. Fortney (Exec '11) – U.S. Air Force Brigadier General
 Jeffrey Fowler (MPA '90) – United States Navy, Vice Admiral; Superintendent, United States Naval Academy
 John C. Harvey (MPA '88) – United States Navy, Admiral; Commander, U.S. Fleet Forces Command
 Robert C. Hinson (Exec) – U.S. Air Force Lieutenant General
 William E. Ingram Jr. (Exec '02) – U.S. Army Lieutenant General and Director of the Army National Guard
 Richard C. Johnston (Exec) – U.S. Air Force Brigadier General
 Andrew F. Krepinevich Jr. (MPA '80) – United States Army, Lt. Col.; author of The Army and Vietnam
 Rick Linnehan (MPA '09) – astronaut
 Christopher Loria (MPA '04) – astronaut
 Robert W. Parker (Exec '91) – U.S. Air Force Major General
 Timothy S. Sullivan (Exec) – U.S. Coast Guard Rear Admiral
 Guy C. Swan III (MPA '86) – U.S. Army Major General, Commanding General of the Military District of Washington
 Jack Weinstein (Exec '06) – U.S. Air Force Major General
 Muhammad Haszaimi (Exec '16) – Royal Brunei Armed Forces Commander

Non-profit organizations

 Ayisha Osori – former CEO, Nigerian Women’s Trust Fund
 Lester R. Brown (MPA '62) – founder and President of the Earth Policy Institute
 Rick Doblin (PhD '01) – Founder and executive director, Multidisciplinary Association for Psychedelic Studies (MAPS)
 Robert Kagan (MPP '91) – co-founder, Project for a New American Century
 Nancy LeaMond (MPP '74) – Executive vice president, AARP
 Giovanna Negretti (MPA '05) – co-founder and executive director of ¿Oiste?
 Michelle Rhee (MPP '97) – founder of The New Teacher Project; Chancellor of the Washington, D.C. public school system
 Bryan Stevenson (MPP '85) – founder and executive director of the Equal Justice Initiative, and author of Just Mercy
 Ramaswami Balasubramaniam (MPA'10) – Founder and president, Swami Vivekananda Youth Movement

Spies 
 Donald Heathfield (real name: Andrey Bezrukov) (MPA '00) – KGB and SVR operative until his disclosure in the United States in 2010

See also
 Public policy school
 List of memorials to John F. Kennedy

Notes

References

External links

 
 Campus map & directory

Robert A. M. Stern buildings
 
Public administration schools in the United States
Public policy schools
Schools of international relations in the United States
School of Government
Educational institutions established in 1936
1936 establishments in Massachusetts
1966 establishments in Massachusetts
Harvard University schools